La Batalla (English: The Battle) is the second studio album by Dominican singer Antony Santos. It was released in 1992 by Platano Records and RM Records. This album included famous songs like the merengues "El Baile Del Perrito" and "Yo Me Muero Por Ti". Also, bachatas like "Florecita Blanca", Vengo De Alla, and "Antologia De Caricias", which is a cover of a song from Altamira Banda Show, and Ay Mujer, which is a cover of Juan Luis Guerra's song from his 1987 album, Mientras Más Lo Pienso...Tú.

Track listing

Charts

References 

1992 albums
Antony Santos albums
Latin music albums
Spanish-language albums